Local mean time (LMT) is a form of solar time that corrects the variations of local apparent time, forming a uniform time scale at a specific longitude. This measurement of time was used for everyday use during the 19th century before time zones were introduced beginning in the late 19th century; it still has some uses in astronomy and navigation.

Past use
Local mean time was used from the early 19th century, when local solar time or sundial time was last used until standard time was adopted on various dates in the several countries.   Each town or city kept its own meridian.  This led to a situation where locations one degree of longitude apart had times four minutes apart. This became a problem in the mid 19th century when railways needed clocks that were synchronized between stations, at the same time as people needed to match their clock (or the church clock) to the time tables. Standard time means that the same time is used throughout some region—usually, it was either offset from Greenwich Mean Time or was the local mean time of the capital of the region. The difference between local mean time and local apparent time is the equation of time.

See also
 Day
 Time zone

References

Time scales
Time in astronomy

de:Mittlere Ortszeit